Gonyosoma frenatum, common name rein snake, is a species of colubrid snake found in Northeast India, southern China, Taiwan, and Vietnam.

Description
Gonyosoma frenatum reaches roughly 84 cm (2 feet 9 inches) in body length, with a 24 cm (9.5 inch) tail. They are uniform bright green above with a black streak along each side of the head, passing through the eye. The upper lip and lower parts are pale green and they have a whitish ventral keel.

They have a subacuminate snout twice as long as its eye, obliquely truncated and projecting. Its rostral is a little broader than deep and hardly visible from above. The suture between the internasals is much shorter than that between the prefrontals. The frontal is as long as its distance from the end of the snout, shorter than the parietals, with no loreal. The prefrontal is in contact with the labials. It has one large preocular, two post-oculars with temporals 2+2 or 2+3 and 9 (or 8) upper labials, fourth, fifth, and sixth entering the eye. Five lower labials are in contact with the anterior chin-shields, which are as long as the posterior. Scales are in 19 rows, dorsals faintly keeled. Ventrals have a lateral keel, 203–204, anal divided; subcaudals 120–121.

Distribution
NE India (Assam, Arunachal Pradesh)
S China (to SW Sichuan; Fujian, Guangdong, Anhui, Guangxi, Guizhou, Zhejiang)
Taiwan
North Vietnam

Type locality: India: Khasi Hills (Gray, 1853)

References

 Boulenger, George A. 1894 Catalogue of the Snakes in the British Museum (Natural History). Volume II., Containing the Conclusion of the Colubridae Aglyphae. British Mus. (Nat. Hist.), London, xi, 382 pp.
 Gray, J. E. 1853 Descriptions of some undescribed species of reptiles collected by Dr. Joseph Hooker in the Khassia Mountains, East Bengal, and Sikkim Himalaya. Ann. Mag. Nat. Hist. (2) 12: 386 - 392

External links
 https://web.archive.org/web/20030909122037/http://itgmv1.fzk.de/www/itg/uetz/herp/photos/Elaphe_frenata.jpg

Colubrids
Snakes of Asia
Reptiles of India
Reptiles of Taiwan
Reptiles of Vietnam
Taxa named by John Edward Gray
Reptiles described in 1853
Snakes of China
Snakes of Vietnam